Ayumi Hamasaki Countdown Live 2007–2008 Anniversary is a concert DVD issued by the Japanese singer Ayumi Hamasaki. It was released on June 23, 2008.

History
The DVD contains complete footage from Ayumi Hamasaki's Countdown Live concert welcoming the year 2008. It also celebrates the 10th Anniversary since Hamasaki's debut with the single Poker Face released in April 1998.

The DVD features every second of the concert, and includes the first ever live performances of songs such as Sotsugyou Shashin from A Ballads, and Together When..., Untitled: For Her and My All which were released on Hamasaki's 9th album, Guilty.

Also including in the DVD are special behind-the-scenes clips documenting the making of the concert.

Track listing

See official website

Disc 1
 starting over
 talkin' 2 myself
 STEP you
 Ladies Night
 fated
 Together When...
 decision
 SURREAL
 Bold & Delicious
 RAINBOW
 evolution
 Boys & Girls
 glitter

Encore
 Untitled ~For Her~
 Sotsugyou Shashin
 +
 Humming 7/4
 My All
 +special video-making movie (30 min.)

Charts
Oricon Sales Chart (Japan)

References

Ayumi Hamasaki video albums
J-pop
Albums recorded at the Yoyogi National Gymnasium